Siamese (initially named Siamese Fighting Fish also known as SIFIFI) is a Danish rock and metal band. They are signed to Warner Music USA, Avalon Label in Japan and Prime Collective EU. 

They released their debut critically acclaimed album We Are the Sound on 31 January 2011 followed by a tour of Denmark, Sweden, Germany, Benelux and Italy. Their second album is Breathe:See:Move released on 20 August 2012 with "The World Might Have Seen Better Days" being the first single from the album. In 2014, the band changed its name from Siamese Fighting Fish to Siamese. On January 19 2015 the band released a self-titled album Siamese funded via an Indiegogo crowdfunding campaign. In 2017 Siamese signed to Artery Recordings and released its fourth studio album Shameless.

Discography

Albums

References

External links

Facebook
YouTube

Danish musical groups